The Conroy Stolifter was a conversion of the Cessna 337 Super Skymaster, developed by John M. Conroy of Conroy Aircraft starting in 1968.

Development
The Stolifter was created by removing the Skymaster's rear engine and replacing the forward engine with a  Garrett AiResearch TPE 331-25A turboprop. The fuselage was extended to allow almost double the normal cargo volume. The aircraft was also fitted with a Robertson Aircraft Corporation STOL-kit.

The aircraft was intended for a range of military and civil roles, including cargo and troop transport, medevac, reconnaissance and parachute drop.

Only one Stolifter was built. The conversion was approved and the single aircraft produced was given a standard Certificate of Airworthiness. The aircraft still exists as of 2023 and is based in Lyman, Washington, USA.

Specifications (Stolifter)

References

External links
Photo of Conroy Stolifter
Photo of Conroy Stolifter

Stolifter
Twin-boom aircraft
1960s United States civil utility aircraft
Single-engined tractor aircraft
High-wing aircraft
Single-engined turboprop aircraft
Aircraft first flown in 1968